Tommyhawk can refer to:

An alternate spelling of tomahawk (axe)
Tommyhawk, the mascot for the Chicago Blackhawks of the National Hockey League